Vitaliy Dnistryan (born March 31, 1990) is a Ukrainian footballer.

Playing career 
Dnistryan began his career in 2008 with FC Enerhetyk Burshtyn in the Ukrainian First League. The following season he signed with FC Skala Stryi in the Ukrainian Second League. He later had stints with MFC Mykolaiv, FC Krymteplytsia Molodizhne, FC Stal Kamianske, and NK Veres Rivne.

In 2016, he went overseas to play with FC Ukraine United in the Canadian Soccer League. In his debut season he appeared in 19 matches and recorded 3 goals. The following season he played with FC Vorkuta.

References 

1990 births
Living people
Ukrainian footballers
FC Enerhetyk Burshtyn players
FC Skala Stryi (2004) players
MFC Mykolaiv players
FC Krymteplytsia Molodizhne players
FC Stal Kamianske players
NK Veres Rivne players
FC Ukraine United players
FC Continentals players
Canadian Soccer League (1998–present) players
Association football midfielders
Ukrainian First League players
Ukrainian expatriate footballers
Ukrainian expatriate sportspeople in Canada
Expatriate soccer players in Canada
Ukrainian Second League players
Sportspeople from Lviv Oblast